Hazel is a primarily female given name meaning "hazel", from the name of the tree or the color. It is derived from the Old English hæsel. It became a popular name in English-speaking countries during the 19th century, along with other names of plants or trees used for girls.  

The name was among the 25 most popular names for girls in the United States at the turn of the 20th century. It declined in usage in that country after the 1960s but rose again in usage after 1998. It has ranked among the top 50 names for newborn girls in the United States since 2017. It also was occasionally used for boys in the United States between 1900 and 1940.

The name has also increased in popularity in recent years for girls in other English-speaking countries such as Ireland.

Variations include Hazell, Hazelle, Hasel and Heizle. Elaborations in use in the United States include Hazelgrace, Hazelmae, and Hazelmarie. Other names in use such as Hazelee, Hazeleigh, Hazelyn and Hazelynn might in some instances be variants.

People
Hazel Blears (b. 1956), British politician and Labour MP for Salford
Hazel Brown (1942–2022), Trinbagonian women's and consumer rights activist
Hazel Byford (b. 1941), Conservative member of House of Lords, Britain
Hazel Carby (b. 1948), professor of African American Studies and of American Studies
Hazel Carter (1894–1918), American army stowaway and writer
Hazel Court (1926–2008), British actress
Hazel Crowney, British-born Bollywood (India) film actress
Hazel Dickens (1925–2011), American bluegrass singer
Hazel Findlay, British climber and mountaineer
nickname of Hedley Hazelden (1915–2001), British test pilot and Second World War pilot
Hazel Gaynor (b. 1971), English author in Ireland
Hazel Hayes (b. 1985), Irish YouTuber, filmmaker, and author
Hazel Hutchins, Canadian children's author
Hazel Irvine (b. 1965), British television presenter
Hazel Keech, British-Mauritian film actress
Hazel Bryan Massery, protesting student caught in a legendary photograph during the integration crisis
Hazel McCallion (1921–2023), mayor of Mississauga, Ontario, Canada
Hazel Miner (1904-1920), who died saving her siblings during a spring blizzard in Center, Oliver County, North Dakota
Hazel O'Connor, British singer-songwriter and actress
Hazel R. O'Leary, former United States Secretary of Energy
Hazel Perfect (d. 2015), British mathematician
Hazel Scott (1920–1981), jazz and classical pianist and singer
Hazel Schmoll (1890–1990), American botanist
Hazel Mountain Walker (1889–1980), among the first African-American women to pass the Ohio bar
Hazel Wood Waterman (1865–1948), American architect
Hazel Hotchkiss Wightman (1886–1974), American tennis player
Hazel Wong, a UAE-Hong Kong Architect

Fictional characters
Hazel Aden, in the Canadian television drama Degrassi: The Next Generation
Hazel Bellamy, in Upstairs, Downstairs
Hazel (Burke), maid to the Baxter family in the comic strip Hazel and the television sitcom based on it
Hazel Charming, in the animated preschool series Little Charmers
Hazel Flagg, protagonist in the film Nothing Sacred
Hazel Frost, mother of Emma Frost, a character in Marvel's X-Men comics
Hazel Grace Lancaster, in John Green's novel The Fault in Our Stars
Hazel Motes, in Flannery O'Connor's novel Wise Blood
Hazel Levesque, a daughter of Pluto and one of the seven in Rick Riordan's Heroes of Olympus
Captain Hazel Murphy, character on Sealab 2021
Hazel Shade, daughter of the poet John Shade in the novel Pale Fire
Hazel Stone (Heinlein), created by Robert A. Heinlein
Hazel Woolley, a character in the radio soap opera The Archers
Hazel, rabbit leader in the Richard Adams novel Watership Down
Hazel, in Kazuya Minekura's manga series Gensoumaden Saiyuki
Hazel, the narrator of Brian Vaughan's comic book Saga and the first hybrid child to survive infancy
Hazel, a minor antagonist of the television series (Hazel was a man who came from a time when Hazel was more commonly used as the first name of a male) The Umbrella Academy
Hazel Rainart, an antagonist from the anime webseries RWBY

Notes

English feminine given names
English given names
Feminine given names
Given names derived from plants or flowers